Gladney is a surname. Notable people with the surname include:

Bob Gladney (born 1957), Canadian ice hockey player
Dru C. Gladney, American anthropologist
Edna Gladney (1886–1961), American activist
Graves Gladney (1907–1976), American illustrator
Heather Gladney (born 1957), American writer
Jeff Gladney (1996–2022), American football player
Larry Gladney (born 1957), American physicist and cosmologist